The twelfth season of the reality/sports competition series American Ninja Warrior premiered on September 7, 2020 and wrapped up on November 6, 2020 on NBC. Due to the COVID-19 pandemic in the United States, all eight episodes were filmed in St. Louis, Missouri from June 29 to July 25, 2020, behind closed doors in the America's Center convention center and stadium. Matt Iseman and Akbar Gbaja-Biamila returned for their respective eleventh and eighth seasons, while Zuri Hall returned for her second season on the show.

The course returns with the Mega Wall and Power Tower, and the fifty most popular athletes from previous seasons returned with two other ninjas (mostly rookies) of their choosing, like their ninja training partners or someone they have a special connection with. The top twelve competitors moved on to the semifinals after each qualifying episode, as well as the top three women. In this season, the player who won the Power Tower would get to bring their chosen rookies with them to the semifinals, even if the rookies had not made it into the top twelve finishers (or top three women). With the knockout tournament format, there were changed to the semifinals courses as well — unlike the past seasons, a competitor that completed the course would not automatically move on; they would have to be in the top 12 or have made it up the Mega Wall. One contestant, Nick Hanson, did not move on to the semifinals because of COVID contact tracing despite making it up the Mega Wall. Because of the format change to a knockout tournament and a team format instead of the traditional Sasuke format, the winner's prize has been decreased to only $100,000 and there is no "Last Ninja Standing" prize for the season.

Obstacles

St. Louis Qualifying

St. Louis Semifinals

St. Louis Finals

St. Louis Qualifying

Night 1

The first qualifying round featured three new obstacles, Weight for It, Ring Chaser, and Rib Run. Notable ninjas running the course were school teachers, medical professionals, and ICU nurses who are all making a difference on the frontlines of the COVID-19 pandemic. Also, former NFL linebacker Kamerion Wimbley returned after his record-setting season in 2012, being the biggest man (240 pounds) to complete a course.

 As a result of United States v. Drechsel, which was announced after taping for the season had ended, significant edits were made to this episode. Drechsel's run did not air. The 13th-place contestant also failed Slingshot, but did not advance. Johnson, who finished behind other contestants but was the second-place female ninja, was given credit as the 12th-place finisher. Johnson and Ferguson were rookies selected by Drechsel. Also, the Power Tower Playoff, which was Drechsel and Avila, was not broadcast because of the ongoing legal issues.  According to sources, Avila won the round.

Night 2
Ashley McConville became the twentieth woman in ANW history to make it up the Warped Wall and move on to the semifinals, and Jake Murray's teammates, former AHL hockey player Barry Goers of the Wilkes-Barre/Scranton Penguins and Glenn Albright moved on to the semifinals due to Murray's win on the Power Tower. Also, the "Eskimo Ninja" Nick Hanson completed the course and made it up the Mega Wall but did not have a fast enough time to make it into the top 12.

Also of note, second-place finisher Ethan "The Swan" Swanson did not compete in the semifinals after he came in close contact with another competitor who had tested positive for COVID-19.

Night 3
Stuntwoman Jessie Graff once again completed the course, making it to the end to tie Jesse "Flex" Labreck for the most buzzers among women ninjas with five. Meanwhile, the teammates of drummer R.J. Roman of metal band Emuness, Ben Melick and Jessica Helmer moved on to the semifinals even though they did not complete the course because Roman won the Power Tower.

Despite finishing among the top three women, Rachael Goldstein was unable to compete in the semifinals due to a broken finger which she suffered while filming a special episode of American Ninja Warrior in St. Louis.

Night 4
"The Weatherman" Joe Moravsky just edged out Michael Torres, who had the fastest time, and brought his teammates, Will Schlageter and Jeshuah Lewis back in the competition. Notable ninjas featured "Big Cat" Karsten Williams, rookie former MLB player of the San Francisco Giants Gary Brown who ran the course, making it to the fifth obstacle. Also, six-time ANW veteran Tiana "Sweet T" Webberley hit the buzzer for the first time, as well as ICU nurse Mady Howard who completed the course with the fastest time for the women.

St. Louis Qualifying Leaderboard

St. Louis Semifinals

Night 1
Some notable competitors like Grant McCartney, Kevin Bull, Abel Gonzalez and Mathis "Kid" Owhadi failed on Corkscrew, an obstacle new to this season, and did not advance to the finals.

Night 2

Drew Drechsel originally finished in the top 12, but due to his post-taping legal issues, his runs were edited out. Devin Harrelson finished 13th, as he was eliminated on the Corkscrew with a faster time exiting the Salmon Ladder than Graff. However, Graff, the top woman who actually finished outside the top twelve, was upgraded to 12th in post-production.

St. Louis Semifinals Leaderboard

St. Louis Finals

The finals of the show spanned two nights—episode seven, and the beginning of episode eight.

Power Tower Playoff Bracket 
The Final 8 competed in a single-elimination tournament format with the top 8 seeded based on the performance in the final. The result are as follows:

American Ninja Warrior 12 champion: Daniel Gil

Broadcast Notes and United States v. Drechsel Case 
On July 31, 2020, just six days after taping concluded, the U.S. Department of Justice formally charged contestant Drew Drechsel, the season eleven champion, with four felonies for various crimes in regards to criminal sexual conduct in regards to a complaint filed by a 19-year old woman to the police in Cherry Hill, New Jersey. Following an August 4 press release by the Department of Justice, NBC cut ties with him, did not air his runs, and prohibited him from appearing in future seasons. They did, however, air the rookies Drechsel chose to compete off-screen. In addition, because Drechsel competed on the Power Tower in episode one (losing to "Big Dog Ninja" Jody Avila), the Power Tower competition was not aired; Avila was credited with a win by forfeit. Fellow ninja Joe Moravsky stated on a Twitch stream that Drechsel didn’t make it to the Power Tower Playoffs.

Ratings

References

American Ninja Warrior
2020 American television seasons
Television productions postponed due to the COVID-19 pandemic
Television shows filmed in Missouri